Gobinda Chandra Khatick Road (formerly Hughes Road) is a famous thoroughfare in the city of Kolkata (formerly Calcutta), India. The road runs past Grace Ling Liang Church, Tangra Police Station and largely through the China Town areas of Tangra in East Kolkata and crosses Pulin Khatik Road and Christopher Road at separate intersections. Gobinda Chandra Khatik road is 2.1 kilometers in length from the Tangra Slaughterhouse to the Topsia Junction. It demarcated the Eastern Fringes of the city at a time when Chinese operated Tanneries and Leatherworks dominated the area. Nowadays, China Town is a haven of Indo Chinese Fusion food and has crafted a legacy in its own right.
Initially called Hughes Road until 1985, the name was renamed to recognise the contribution of Late Gobinda Khatik. Recent Urbanization and rapid growth has rapidly changed the landscape of Tangra and traffic snarls on the once empty road are common. The road is long and narrow and caters to Bi-Directional traffic. Dhangars, a community of Untouchable sanitary workers established their colony along this road. The road falls under Ward no. 56, 59 and 66 of the KMC.

Gallery

See also
 Streets in Kolkata

References

Streets in Kolkata
Tourist attractions in Kolkata
Shopping districts and streets in India